Saldanda Village (Kichanas) is a village of Nepal. This village is located in Kichanas VDC wad no: 9 and Syangja in the Gandaki Zone after present Nepali governmental policy. But saldanda Village located at Harinas Gaupalika wad no: 1.

History

Education

Population
More than 2000 people live in this village.

Photos gallery
Few famous picture collection of Saldanda Village

References

Populated places in Syangja District